Deenshah Gaura is a community development block in Dalmau tehsil of Raebareli district, Uttar Pradesh, India. It consists of 71 rural villages, with a total population of 104,149 people. The headquarters are located in the village of Gaura Hardo.

Demographics 
As of 2011, Deenshah Gaura CD block has a population of 104,149 people, in 19,192 households. This population includes 53,811 males and 50,338 females. The corresponding sex ratio of 935 females to every 1000 males is lower than the district rural average of 945. About 13.7% of the block's population is in the 0-6 age group as of 2011. The sex ratio of this group is 912, which is lower than the rural average of 928 for Raebareli district. Members of Scheduled Castes make up 30.16% of the block's population, and members of Scheduled Tribes make up 0.04%. The literacy rate of Deenshah Gaura block is 68.39% (counting only people age 7 and up); literacy is higher among men and boys (79.03%) than among women and girls (57.07%). Among Scheduled Castes, the literacy rate is 55.81% — 66.43% among men and boys, and 44.83% among women and girls.

In terms of employment, 17.04% of Deenshah Gaura block residents were classified as main workers (i.e. people employed for at least 6 months per year) in 2011. Marginal workers (i.e. people employed for less than 6 months per year) made up 18.73%, and the remaining 64.22% were non-workers. Employment status varied significantly according to gender, with 49.45% of men being either main or marginal workers, compared to only 21.15% of women.

Agriculture is the predominant source of employment in Deenshah Gaura block: 28.65% of the block's workers were cultivators who owned or leased their own land as of 2011, and a further 48.23% were agricultural labourers who worked someone else's land for wages. Another 4.23% were counted as household industry workers, and the remaining 18.89% were other workers.

Villages 
Deenshah Gaura CD block has the following 71 villages:

References

Raebareli district
Community development blocks in India